Gordon Ross-Soden (31 May 1888 – 20 March 1931) was an Australian rules footballer who played with Essendon in the Victorian Football League (VFL).

Notes

External links 
		

1888 births
1931 deaths
Australian rules footballers from Victoria (Australia)
Essendon Football Club players